Mirny (masculine), Mirnaya (feminine), or Mirnoye (neuter) is the name of several inhabited localities in Russia.

Republic of Adygea
As of 2010, two rural localities in the Republic of Adygea bear this name:
Mirny, Krasnogvardeysky District, Republic of Adygea, a settlement in Krasnogvardeysky District
Mirny, Maykopsky District, Republic of Adygea, a settlement in Maykopsky District

Altai Krai
As of 2010, eight rural localities in Altai Krai bear this name:
Mirny, Burlinsky District, Altai Krai, a rural locality classified as a crossing loop in Burlinsky Selsoviet of Burlinsky District
Mirny, Kulundinsky District, Altai Krai, a settlement in Kursky Selsoviet of Kulundinsky District
Mirny, Loktevsky District, Altai Krai, a settlement in Kirovsky Selsoviet of Loktevsky District
Mirny, Rodinsky District, Altai Krai, a settlement in Mirnensky Selsoviet of Rodinsky District
Mirny, Shipunovsky District, Altai Krai, a settlement in Gorkovsky Selsoviet of Shipunovsky District
Mirny, Uglovsky District, Altai Krai, a settlement in Mirnensky Selsoviet of Uglovsky District
Mirny, Yegoryevsky District, Altai Krai, a settlement in Pervomaysky Selsoviet of Yegoryevsky District
Mirny, Zonalny District, Altai Krai, a settlement in Chemrovsky Selsoviet of Zonalny District

Amur Oblast
As of 2010, one rural locality in Amur Oblast bears this name:
Mirnoye, Amur Oblast, a selo in Prigorodny Rural Settlement of Belogorsky District

Arkhangelsk Oblast
As of 2010, four inhabited localities in Arkhangelsk Oblast bear this name.

Urban localities
Mirny, Arkhangelsk Oblast, a town; administratively incorporated as a town of oblast significance

Rural localities
Mirny, Konoshsky District, Arkhangelsk Oblast, a settlement under the administrative jurisdiction of Konosha Urban-Type Settlement with Jurisdictional Territory in Konoshsky District
Mirny, Nyandomsky District, Arkhangelsk Oblast, a settlement under the administrative jurisdiction of the town of district significance of Nyandoma in Nyandomsky District
Mirny, Ustyansky District, Arkhangelsk Oblast, a settlement in Likhachevsky Selsoviet of Ustyansky District

Astrakhan Oblast
As of 2010, one rural locality in Astrakhan Oblast bears this name:
Mirny, Astrakhan Oblast, a settlement in Solyansky Selsoviet of Narimanovsky District

Republic of Bashkortostan
As of 2010, one rural locality in the Republic of Bashkortostan bears this name:
Mirny, Republic of Bashkortostan, a selo in Mirnovsky Selsoviet of Blagovarsky District

Belgorod Oblast
As of 2010, one rural locality in Belgorod Oblast bears this name:
Mirny, Belgorod Oblast, a settlement in Krasnogvardeysky District

Bryansk Oblast
As of 2010, four rural localities in Bryansk Oblast bear this name:
Mirny, Bryansky District, Bryansk Oblast, a settlement in Zhurinichsky Rural Administrative Okrug of Bryansky District
Mirny, Gordeyevsky District, Bryansk Oblast, a settlement in Gordeyevsky District
Mirny, Kletnyansky District, Bryansk Oblast, a settlement in Mirninsky Rural Administrative Okrug of Kletnyansky District
Mirny, Starodubsky District, Bryansk Oblast, a settlement in Mishkovsky Rural Administrative Okrug of Starodubsky District

Chechen Republic
As of 2010, two rural localities in the Chechen Republic bear this name:
Mirny, Naursky District, Chechen Republic, a khutor in Mekenskaya Rural Administration of Naursky District
Mirny, Shelkovskoy District, Chechen Republic, a settlement in Sary-Suyskaya Rural Administration of Shelkovskoy District

Chelyabinsk Oblast
As of 2010, six rural localities in Chelyabinsk Oblast bear this name:
Mirny, Chebarkulsky District, Chelyabinsk Oblast, a settlement in Bishkilsky Selsoviet of Chebarkulsky District
Mirny, Krasnoarmeysky District, Chelyabinsk Oblast, a settlement in Kozyrevsky Selsoviet of Krasnoarmeysky District
Mirny, Sosnovsky District, Chelyabinsk Oblast, a settlement in Mirnensky Selsoviet of Sosnovsky District
Mirny, Uvelsky District, Chelyabinsk Oblast, a settlement in Uvelsky Selsoviet of Uvelsky District
Mirny, Uysky District, Chelyabinsk Oblast, a settlement in Sokolovsky Selsoviet of Uysky District
Mirnoye, Chelyabinsk Oblast, a selo in Bredinsky Selsoviet of Bredinsky District

Chuvash Republic
As of 2010, one rural locality in the Chuvash Republic bears this name:
Mirny, Chuvash Republic, a settlement in Buinskoye Rural Settlement of Ibresinsky District

Republic of Dagestan
As of 2010, one rural locality in the Republic of Dagestan bears this name:
Mirnoye, Republic of Dagestan, a selo in Kizlyarsky Selsoviet of Kizlyarsky District

Irkutsk Oblast
As of 2010, one rural locality in Irkutsk Oblast bears this name:
Mirny, Irkutsk Oblast, a selo in Tayshetsky District

Kaliningrad Oblast
As of 2010, one rural locality in Kaliningrad Oblast bears this name:
Mirny, Kaliningrad Oblast, a settlement in Dobrovolsky Rural Okrug of Krasnoznamensky District

Republic of Kalmykia
As of 2010, one rural locality in the Republic of Kalmykia bears this name:
Mirny, Republic of Kalmykia, a settlement in Mirnenskaya Rural Administration of Oktyabrsky District

Kaluga Oblast
As of 2010, three rural localities in Kaluga Oblast bear this name:
Mirny, Kaluga, Kaluga Oblast, a settlement under the administrative jurisdiction of the City of Kaluga
Mirny, Baryatinsky District, Kaluga Oblast, a settlement in Baryatinsky District
Mirny, Duminichsky District, Kaluga Oblast, a settlement in Duminichsky District

Kemerovo Oblast
As of 2010, one rural locality in Kemerovo Oblast bears this name:
Mirny, Kemerovo Oblast, a settlement in Chkalovskaya Rural Territory of Leninsk-Kuznetsky District

Khabarovsk Krai
As of 2010, one rural locality in Khabarovsk Krai bears this name:
Mirnoye, Khabarovsk Krai, a selo in Khabarovsky District

Republic of Khakassia
As of 2010, one rural locality in the Republic of Khakassia bears this name:
Mirny, Republic of Khakassia, a selo in Kommunarovsky Selsoviet of Shirinsky District

Kirov Oblast
As of 2010, two inhabited localities in Kirov Oblast bear this name.

Urban localities
Mirny, Orichevsky District, Kirov Oblast, an urban-type settlement in Orichevsky District

Rural localities
Mirny, Kilmezsky District, Kirov Oblast, a settlement in Damaskinsky Rural Okrug of Kilmezsky District

Komi Republic
As of 2010, one rural locality in the Komi Republic bears this name:
Mirny, Komi Republic, a settlement in Mitrofan-Dikost Rural-type Settlement Administrative Territory of Troitsko-Pechorsky District

Kostroma Oblast
As of 2010, one rural locality in Kostroma Oblast bears this name:
Mirny, Kostroma Oblast, a settlement in Sudislavskoye Settlement of Sudislavsky District

Krasnodar Krai
As of 2010, fifteen rural localities in Krasnodar Krai bear this name:
Mirny, Goryachy Klyuch, Krasnodar Krai, a settlement in Bezymyanny Rural Okrug under the administrative jurisdiction of the Town of Goryachy Klyuch
Mirny, Belorechensky District, Krasnodar Krai, a settlement in Druzhnensky Rural Okrug of Belorechensky District
Mirny, Gulkevichsky District, Krasnodar Krai, a settlement in Kuban Rural Okrug of Gulkevichsky District
Mirny, Kalininsky District, Krasnodar Krai, a settlement in Kuybyshevsky Rural Okrug of Kalininsky District
Mirny, Korenovsky District, Krasnodar Krai, a settlement under the administrative jurisdiction of the Town of Korenovsk in Korenovsky District
Mirny, Krasnoarmeysky District, Krasnodar Krai, a settlement in Oktyabrsky Rural Okrug of Krasnoarmeysky District
Mirny, Kushchyovsky District, Krasnodar Krai, a settlement in Stepnyansky Rural Okrug of Kushchyovsky District
Mirny, Labinsky District, Krasnodar Krai, a settlement in Luchevoy Rural Okrug of Labinsky District
Mirny, Novopokrovsky District, Krasnodar Krai, a settlement in Pokrovsky Rural Okrug of Novopokrovsky District
Mirny, Seversky District, Krasnodar Krai, a settlement in Smolensky Rural Okrug of Seversky District
Mirny, Starominsky District, Krasnodar Krai, a khutor in Kuybyshevsky Rural Okrug of Starominsky District
Mirny, Tbilissky District, Krasnodar Krai, a settlement in Tbilissky Rural Okrug of Tbilissky District
Mirny, Tikhoretsky District, Krasnodar Krai, a settlement in Bratsky Rural Okrug of Tikhoretsky District
Mirny, Timashyovsky District, Krasnodar Krai, a khutor in Derbentsky Rural Okrug of Timashyovsky District
Mirny, Yeysky District, Krasnodar Krai, a settlement in Morevsky Rural Okrug of Yeysky District

Krasnoyarsk Krai
As of 2010, one rural locality in Krasnoyarsk Krai bears this name:
Mirnoye, Krasnoyarsk Krai, a village in Turukhansky District

Kursk Oblast
As of 2010, one rural locality in Kursk Oblast bears this name:
Mirny, Kursk Oblast, a settlement in Zamostyansky Selsoviet of Sudzhansky District

Lipetsk Oblast
As of 2010, three rural localities in Lipetsk Oblast bear this name:
Mirny, Dankovsky District, Lipetsk Oblast, a settlement in Malinkovsky Selsoviet of Dankovsky District
Mirny, Zadonsky District, Lipetsk Oblast, a settlement in Skornyakovsky Selsoviet of Zadonsky District
Mirnoye, Lipetsk Oblast, a selo in Kasharsky Selsoviet of Zadonsky District

Moscow Oblast
As of 2010, three rural localities in Moscow Oblast bear this name:
Mirny, Lyuberetsky District, Moscow Oblast, a settlement under the administrative jurisdiction of the Work Settlement of  Tomilino in Lyuberetsky District
Mirny, Ramensky District, Moscow Oblast, a settlement in Kuznetsovskoye Rural Settlement of Ramensky District
Mirny, Serpukhovsky District, Moscow Oblast, a settlement in Dashkovskoye Rural Settlement of Serpukhovsky District

Nizhny Novgorod Oblast
As of 2010, three rural localities in Nizhny Novgorod Oblast bear this name:
Mirny, Bogorodsky District, Nizhny Novgorod Oblast, a settlement in Doskinsky Selsoviet of Bogorodsky District
Mirny, Varnavinsky District, Nizhny Novgorod Oblast, a settlement in Voskhodovsky Selsoviet of Varnavinsky District
Mirny, Voskresensky District, Nizhny Novgorod Oblast, a settlement in Glukhovsky Selsoviet of Voskresensky District

Republic of North Ossetia–Alania
As of 2010, one rural locality in the Republic of North Ossetia–Alania bears this name:
Mirny, Republic of North Ossetia–Alania, a settlement in Vinogradnensky Rural Okrug of Mozdoksky District

Novgorod Oblast
As of 2010, two rural localities in Novgorod Oblast bear this name:
Mirny, Novgorod Oblast, a settlement in Morkhovskoye Settlement of Kholmsky District
Mirnaya, Novgorod Oblast, a village in Vybitskoye Settlement of Soletsky District

Novosibirsk Oblast
As of 2010, four rural localities in Novosibirsk Oblast bear this name:
Mirny, Kochenyovsky District, Novosibirsk Oblast, a settlement in Kochenyovsky District
Mirny, Kuybyshevsky District, Novosibirsk Oblast, a settlement in Kuybyshevsky District
Mirny, Toguchinsky District, Novosibirsk Oblast, a settlement in Toguchinsky District
Mirny, Ust-Tarksky District, Novosibirsk Oblast, a settlement in Ust-Tarksky District

Orenburg Oblast
As of 2010, two rural localities in Orenburg Oblast bear this name:
Mirny, Orsk, Orenburg Oblast, a settlement in Mirny Selsoviet of the city of Orsk
Mirny, Alexandrovsky District, Orenburg Oblast, a settlement in Khortitsky Selsoviet of Alexandrovsky District

Oryol Oblast
As of 2010, two rural localities in Oryol Oblast bear this name:
Mirny, Kromskoy District, Oryol Oblast, a settlement in Koroskovsky Selsoviet of Kromskoy District
Mirny, Soskovsky District, Oryol Oblast, a settlement in Lobyntsevsky Selsoviet of Soskovsky District

Penza Oblast
As of 2010, one rural locality in Penza Oblast bears this name:
Mirny, Penza Oblast, a settlement in Yurovsky Selsoviet of Mokshansky District

Primorsky Krai
As of 2010, one rural locality in Primorsky Krai bears this name:
Mirny, Primorsky Krai, a settlement in Nadezhdinsky District

Pskov Oblast
As of 2010, one rural locality in Pskov Oblast bears this name:
Mirny, Pskov Oblast, a village in Pytalovsky District

Rostov Oblast
As of 2010, two rural localities in Rostov Oblast bear this name:
Mirny, Dubovsky District, Rostov Oblast, a khutor in Mirnenskoye Rural Settlement of Dubovsky District
Mirny, Yegorlyksky District, Rostov Oblast, a khutor in Balko-Gruzskoye Rural Settlement of Yegorlyksky District

Ryazan Oblast
As of 2010, one rural locality in Ryazan Oblast bears this name:
Mirny, Ryazan Oblast, a settlement in Borshevsky Rural Okrug of Miloslavsky District

Sakha Republic
As of 2010, one urban locality in the Sakha Republic bears this name:
Mirny, Sakha Republic, a town under republic jurisdiction in Mirninsky District

Samara Oblast
As of 2010, one urban locality in Samara Oblast bears this name:
Mirny, Samara Oblast, an urban-type settlement in Krasnoyarsky District

Saratov Oblast
As of 2010, seven rural localities in Saratov Oblast bear this name:
Mirny, Dergachyovsky District, Saratov Oblast, a settlement in Dergachyovsky District
Mirny, Ivanteyevsky District, Saratov Oblast, a settlement in Ivanteyevsky District
Mirny, Novouzensky District, Saratov Oblast, a settlement in Novouzensky District
Mirny, Petrovsky District, Saratov Oblast, a settlement in Petrovsky District
Mirny, Yekaterinovsky District, Saratov Oblast, a settlement in Yekaterinovsky District
Mirny, Yershovsky District, Saratov Oblast, a settlement in Yershovsky District
Mirnoye, Saratov Oblast, a selo in Rovensky District

Stavropol Krai
As of 2010, four rural localities in Stavropol Krai bear this name:
Mirny, Kursky District, Stavropol Krai, a settlement in Mirnensky Selsoviet of Kursky District
Mirny, Mineralovodsky District, Stavropol Krai, a settlement in Prikumsky Selsoviet of Mineralovodsky District
Mirny, Predgorny District, Stavropol Krai, a settlement in Predgorny District
Mirnoye, Stavropol Krai, a selo in Blagodarnensky District

Sverdlovsk Oblast
As of 2010, one rural locality in Sverdlovsk Oblast bears this name:
Mirny, Sverdlovsk Oblast, a settlement under the administrative jurisdiction of the Town of Serov

Tambov Oblast
As of 2010, two rural localities in Tambov Oblast bear this name:
Mirny, Kirsanovsky District, Tambov Oblast, a settlement in Kovylsky Selsoviet of Kirsanovsky District
Mirny, Tambovsky District, Tambov Oblast, a settlement in Donskoy Selsoviet of Tambovsky District

Tomsk Oblast
As of 2010, one rural locality in Tomsk Oblast bears this name:
Mirny, Tomsk Oblast, a settlement in Tomsky District

Tula Oblast
As of 2010, two rural localities in Tula Oblast bear this name:
Mirny, Novomoskovsky District, Tula Oblast, a settlement under the administrative jurisdiction of Novomoskovsk City Under District Jurisdiction in Novomoskovsky District
Mirny, Yefremovsky District, Tula Oblast, a settlement in Tormasovsky Rural Okrug of Yefremovsky District

Tver Oblast
As of 2010, six rural localities in Tver Oblast bear this name:
Mirny, Konakovsky District, Tver Oblast, a settlement under the administrative jurisdiction of Novozavidovsky Urban Settlement in Konakovsky District
Mirny, Likhoslavlsky District, Tver Oblast, a settlement in Tolmachevskoye Rural Settlement of Likhoslavlsky District
Mirny, Nelidovsky District, Tver Oblast, a settlement in Zemtsovskoye Rural Settlement of Nelidovsky District
Mirny, Oleninsky District, Tver Oblast, a settlement in Mostovskoye Rural Settlement of Oleninsky District
Mirny, Torzhoksky District, Tver Oblast, a settlement in Mirnovskoye Rural Settlement of Torzhoksky District
Mirnaya, Tver Oblast, a village in Yemelyanovskoye Rural Settlement of Staritsky District

Tyumen Oblast
As of 2010, two rural localities in Tyumen Oblast bear this name:
Mirny, Abatsky District, Tyumen Oblast, a settlement in Leninsky Rural Okrug of Abatsky District
Mirny, Vagaysky District, Tyumen Oblast, a settlement in Pervovagaysky Rural Okrug of Vagaysky District

Udmurt Republic
As of 2010, one rural locality in the Udmurt Republic bears this name:
Mirny, Udmurt Republic, a pochinok in Yagulsky Selsoviet of Zavyalovsky District

Ulyanovsk Oblast
As of 2010, one rural locality in Ulyanovsk Oblast bears this name:
Mirny, Ulyanovsk Oblast, a settlement in Mirnovsky Rural Okrug of Cherdaklinsky District

Vladimir Oblast
As of 2010, one rural locality in Vladimir Oblast bears this name:
Mirny, Vladimir Oblast, a settlement in Kameshkovsky District

Volgograd Oblast
As of 2010, three rural localities in Volgograd Oblast bear this name:
Mirny, Nekhayevsky District, Volgograd Oblast, a settlement in Dinamovsky Selsoviet of Nekhayevsky District
Mirny, Novonikolayevsky District, Volgograd Oblast, a settlement in Mirny Selsoviet of Novonikolayevsky District
Mirny, Zhirnovsky District, Volgograd Oblast, a settlement in Novinsky Selsoviet of Zhirnovsky District

Vologda Oblast
As of 2010, two rural localities in Vologda Oblast bear this name:
Mirny, Syamzhensky District, Vologda Oblast, a settlement in Dvinitsky Selsoviet of Syamzhensky District
Mirny, Vytegorsky District, Vologda Oblast, a settlement in Kemsky Selsoviet of Vytegorsky District

Voronezh Oblast
As of 2010, one rural locality in Voronezh Oblast bears this name:
Mirny, Voronezh Oblast, a settlement in Verkhnebykovskoye Rural Settlement of Vorobyovsky District

Yaroslavl Oblast
As of 2010, one rural locality in Yaroslavl Oblast bears this name:
Mirnaya, Yaroslavl Oblast, a village in Novinsky Rural Okrug of Nekouzsky District

Zabaykalsky Krai
As of 2010, one rural locality in Zabaykalsky Krai bears this name:
Mirnaya, Zabaykalsky Krai, a settlement at the station in Olovyanninsky District